Ivan Snoj (born 31 October 1923, Zagreb – 18 September 1994) was a Croatian team handball coach and international referee, international sports official, journalist and publicist. By profession he was gym teacher.

Ivan Snoj was one of founders of the Croatian Handball Federation on 19 December 1948.

He was the selector and coach of Croatian first youth team in 1949, on a Yugoslav federal tournament of republican teams which was held in Zagreb. From 1951-1978, he had the function of federal captain (manager) of the Yugoslav team. He was the coach of Yugoslav team that took fifth place at the 1976 Olympics.

Later he was high-positioned official of the International Handball Federation, serving as its vice-president from 1984 to 1992.

Honours
Yugoslavia
1958 World Championship - 8th
1961 World Championship - 9th
1964 World Championship - 6th
1967 World Championship - 7th
1970 World Championship - 3rd
1972 Summer Olympics - 1st
1974 World Championship - 3rd
1976 Summer Olympics - 5th
1978 World Championship - 5th

Sources

External links 
 Hrvatski rukometni portal Ivan Snoj

1923 births
1994 deaths
Croatian handball coaches
Croatian sports executives and administrators
Croatian people of Slovenian descent
Sportspeople from Zagreb
Mediterranean Games gold medalists for Yugoslavia
Competitors at the 1967 Mediterranean Games
Competitors at the 1975 Mediterranean Games
Mediterranean Games medalists in handball